Jankovci railway station is a railway station on Novska–Tovarnik railway. Located in Novi Jankovci, Stari Jankovci. Railroad continued to Vinkovci in one and the other direction to Đeletovci. Jankovci railway station consists of 5 railway tracks.

See also 
 Croatian Railways
 Zagreb–Belgrade railway

References 

Railway stations in Croatia